This is a list of Cal State Northridge Matadors football players in the NFL Draft.

Key

Draft picks

References

Cal State Northridge

Northridge Matadors in the NFL Draft
Cal State Northridge Matadors NFL Draft